Nasouh Nakdali (born 15 June 1993 in Homs, Syria) is a Syrian footballer. He currently plays for Tishreen in Syria.

International career
Al Nakali is currently a member of the Syria national football team.

External links 
 
 Career stats at goalzz.com
  Career stats at Kooora.com

1993 births
Living people
Sportspeople from Homs
Association football midfielders
Syrian footballers
Syria international footballers
Syrian expatriate footballers
Al-Karamah players
Zakho FC players
Naft Al-Wasat SC players
Al-Ittihad Aleppo players
Al-Khabourah SC players
Smouha SC players
Al-Wahda SC (Syria) players
Mesaimeer SC players
Qatari Second Division players
Egyptian Premier League players
Oman Professional League players
Expatriate footballers in Iraq
Syrian expatriate sportspeople in Iraq
Expatriate footballers in Oman
Syrian expatriate sportspeople in Oman
Expatriate footballers in Egypt
Syrian expatriate sportspeople in Egypt
Expatriate footballers in Qatar
Syrian expatriate sportspeople in Qatar
Syrian Premier League players